is a Japanese manga series written and illustrated by Kousuke Oono. Published in the online manga magazine  Bunch since 2018, The Way of the Househusband follows an ex-yakuza member who retires from crime to become a househusband. The series was adapted into a live-action television drama by Nippon TV in 2020. A Netflix original net animation (ONA) anime series produced by J.C.Staff was released from April to October 2021. A second season premiered in January 2023.

Synopsis
Tatsu, an infamous and feared yakuza boss nicknamed "the Immortal Dragon", retires from crime to become a househusband so that he can support Miku, his  wife. The episodic series depicts a variety of comedic scenarios, typically wherein Tatsu's banal domestic work as a househusband is juxtaposed against his intimidating personality and appearance, and his frequent run-ins with former yakuza associates and rivals.

Characters
 
 Portrayed by:  (promotional video and anime) (Japanese); Jonah Scott (English),  (drama)
 A former yakuza boss who applies the skill and intensity he possessed as a crime lord to housework and domestic tasks as a househusband.
 
 Portrayed by: Maaya Sakamoto (promotional video), Shizuka Itō (anime) (Japanese); Laura Post (English),  (drama)
 A career-focused designer with a strong work ethic, and Tatsu's wife. She is secretly an otaku, obsessed with magical girl anime. 
 
 Portrayed by: Kenichi Suzumura (promotional video), Kazuyuki Okitsu (anime) (Japanese); Andres Paul Ramacho (English), Jun Shison (drama)
 An underling in Tatsu's former gang. He often unwittingly comes to assist Tatsu in his chores and errands.
 
 Portrayed by: Yoshimasa Hosoya (promotional video and anime) (Japanese); Ben Pronsky (English),  (drama)
 A former yakuza boss. Tatsu dismantled his gang while he was in prison, and he now owns a food truck that sells crêpes. He still has a big rivalry when Tatsu even when it is about home chores.
 
 Portrayed by: Atsuko Tanaka (anime) (Japanese); Melissa Greenspan (English); Izumi Inamori (drama)
 A former yakuza leader. After her gang was disbanded, she started working at a grocery store. In the live-action she is named Hibari Eguchi and is married to Tatsu's former boss.
 
 Portrayed by: Yuki Kaji (drama spinoff), M.A.O (anime) (Japanese); Laura Stahl (English)
 Tatsu and Miku's cat. It has its own adventures on his own walking around the neighborhood and meeting other animals. 
 
 Portrayed by: Jun Fukushima (anime); Billy Kametz (season 1), Stephen Fu (season 2) (English)
 
 Portrayed by: Kimiko Saitō (anime); Barbara Goodson (English)
 
 Portrayed by: Masashi Nogawa and Junichi Yanagita (anime) (Japanese); Keith Silverstein (English), Junpei Yasui and Yūta Furukawa (drama)
 A couple of policemen. One of them recognizes Tatsu as a dangerous yakuza and tries to find evidence to put him in jail, leading to hilarious mistakes.
 
 Portrayed by: Hōchū Ōtsuka (anime) (Japanese); Jason Marnocha (English), Naoto Takenaka (drama)
 Tatsu's former boss in the yakuza. He tries to make Tatsu come back to his own ways only to discover how skilled Tatsu became as a househusband when Tatsu fed his dog with a tasty plate he cooked himself. In the drama he is named Kikujiro Eguchi and is married to Hibari.
 
 Portrayed by: Tomokazu Sugita (anime); Gogo Lomo-David (English)
 An immigrant that lives in the same building as Tatsu. He nearly suffocates himself while trying to make a BBQ in his own home.
 
 Portrayed by: Subaru Kimura (promotional video and anime); Kaiji Tang (English)
 
 Portrayed  by: Marika Matsumoto (film), Ami Koshimizu (anime), Ryan Bartley (English)
 An employee at the Lovely Donuts fast food chain and the little sister of Torajirō. In the film she is a gang leader.
 
 Portrayed by: Tina Tamashiro (drama)
 A college student working at a cafe, she is a character original to the drama.
 
 Portrayed by: Tamaki Shiratori (drama)
 Miku's daughter and Tatsu's stepdaughter, she is a character original to the drama. She is an elementary school student who is often more serious than her parents.

Media

Manga
The Way of the Househusband, written and illustrated by Kousuke Oono, was initially published on the Shinchosha's online manga magazine Kurage Bunch as a five chapter limited series from February 23 to March 23, 2018, but became popular enough to be serialized as an ongoing series, starting on May 18 of the same year. It has been collected into eleven tankōbon volumes by Shinchosha.

In North America, Viz Media announced it had acquired the rights to publish an English-language translation of the series in February 2019, the first volume of which was published in September of that year.

Promotional videos

Multiple motion comic videos have been produced to promote the release of the series'  volumes. The videos feature Kenjiro Tsuda as the voice of Tatsu, Kenichi Suzumura as the voice of Masa, Yoshimasa Hosoya as the voice of Torajiro, and Subaru Kimura as the voice of G-Goda.

In December 2019, a live-action promotional video adapting scenes from The Way of the Househusband was produced to commemorate the series reaching 1.2 million copies in print. The video stars Tsuda reprising his role as Tatsu and Maaya Sakamoto as Miku, and is co-directed by Tsuda and Hayato Yazaki.

Television drama
On July 8, 2020, Nippon TV announced that it would adapt The Way of the Househusband into a live-action television drama, which premiered in October 2020.

Episode list 

On July 29, 2021, Netflix announced that another live-action adaptation, The Ingenuity of the Househusband, would release on August 29, 2021, starring Kenjiro Tsuda as himself, who previously voiced Tatsu in the anime adaptation and the manga's promotional videos. A second season was released on October 7, 2021.

Anime
At the Netflix Anime Festival on October 26, 2020, an original net animation (ONA) anime series adaptation of The Way of the Househusband was announced. The series is produced by J.C.Staff and directed by Chiaki Kon, with Susumu Yamakawa handling the series' scripts. Kenjiro Tsuda reprised his role as Tatsu from the manga promotional videos. The series was released on April 8, 2021.  A second part of the series was released on October 7, 2021. The opening theme is "Shufu no Michi" (The Path of the Househusband), while the ending theme is "Gokushufukaidō" (The Highway of the Househusband), both performed by Uchikubigokumon-Dōkōkai. A second season was announced at the Netflix Tudum Japan event on September 25, 2022. It premiered on January 1, 2023.

Episode list

Season 1 (2021)

Season 2 (2023)

Film
On November 3, 2021, Sony Pictures Entertainment Japan announced a live-action film set to be released on Summer 2022, with Tōichirō Rutō returning as director. Hiroshi Tamaki, Haruna Kawaguchi, Jun Shison, Tamaki Shiratori, Naoto Takenaka, Izumi Inamori, Kenichi Takitō, Yūta Furukawa, Junpei Yasui, Tina Tamashiro, MEGUMI, and Michiko Tanaka will also return as their characters from the television drama. On February 24, 2022, it was revealed that Kōtarō Yoshida as Kondō, Yumi Adachi as Shiraishi-sensei, Marika Matsumoto as Koharu, Kenta Izuka as Yamamoto, Tomoko Fujita as Katō, Kunito Watanabe as Kazuma and Yua Shinkawa as Kasumi joined the cast.

Reception

Critical reception
The Way of the Househusband has been positively received by critics. Reviewing the first volume of the series for Polygon, writer Julia Lee called The Way of the Househusband "the perfect blend of comedy and action" and "a nice, silly pick-me-up manga." Anime News Network gave the series 4.5 out of 5 stars, calling it "confident and expertly paced, with gorgeous artwork and perfect comic timing." Conversely, Reuben Baron of Comic Book Resources summarized the series as having a "cute premise, but not one with a ton of variation," though he offered praise for the quality of its art.

The anime series, while originally highly anticipated, was heavily criticized for its limited animation, which resembled a motion comic rather than anime. Meanwhile, in the Chinese version which was released on bilibili, the tattoos were completely removed due to television censorship in China.

Sales
1.2 million copies of The Way of the Househusband are in print as of December 2019. In Oricon's sales rankings, the first volume of The Way of the Househusband had sold 95,637 copies as of September 2018, while the second volume had sold 143,051 copies as of January 2019. The first volume of the English-language translation of the series placed sixteenth in Nielsen BookScan's best-selling graphic novels for adults in September 2019.

Awards

|-
! scope="row"|2018
|Best Overall Series
|Pixiv Comic Ranking
|
|
|
|-
! scope="row"|2018
|Best Comedy Series
|Pixiv Comic Ranking
|
|
|
|-
! scope="row"|2018
|Best Web Manga Series
|Next Manga Awards
|
|
|
|-
! scope="row"|2018
|Annual Ranking
|Web Manga General Election
|
|
|
|-
! scope="row"|2018
|Annual Ranking
|Nationwide Bookstore Employees' Recommended Comics of 2018
|
|
|
|-
! scope="row"|2019
|Best Series for Male Readers
|Kono Manga ga Sugoi!
|
|
|
|-
! scope="row"|2020
|Best Humor Publication
|Eisner Awards
|
|English-language translation by Viz Media
|
|-

References

External links
Official website 

2018 manga
2020 Japanese television series debuts
2020 Japanese television series endings
2021 anime ONAs
Action anime and manga
Anime series based on manga
Comedy anime and manga
Cooking in anime and manga
Japanese-language Netflix original programming
J.C.Staff
Netflix original anime
Nippon TV dramas
Seinen manga
Shinchosha manga
Slice of life anime and manga
Viz Media manga
Works about the Yakuza
Yakuza in anime and manga
Japanese comedy films
Japanese action films